The Vallejo Times-Herald is a nearly-daily newspaper in the city of Vallejo, California. It is printed six days a week, Tuesday through Sunday.

History 
Luther Gibson founded the Vallejo Herald in 1922. Later that year, he purchased the Vallejo Times and merged the papers. He owned the paper until 1974 when he sold it to the Donrey Media Group.

On June 20, 1978, 113 of the newspaper's workers went on strike. They established a rival paper, Vallejo Independent Press, directly next door. In spite of widespread support and thousands of Vallejoans canceling their Times-Herald subscriptions in favor of the Vallejo Independent Press, the strike and new paper folded in August 1984, no longer able to compete financially.

In 1999, the Times-Herald changed ownership to the MediaNews Group, who took control of the paper from Donrey. The MediaNews Group became Digital First Media in 2013.

This newspaper was one of three newspapers to receive a letter from the Zodiac Killer on August 1, 1969.

References

Daily newspapers published in the San Francisco Bay Area
MediaNews Group publications
Publications established in 1922
1922 establishments in California
Mass media in Vallejo, California